The 1844 United States presidential election in Indiana took place between November 1 and December 4, 1844, as part of the 1844 United States presidential election. Voters chose 12 representatives, or electors to the Electoral College, who voted for President and Vice President.

Indiana voted for the Democratic candidate, James K. Polk, over Whig candidate Henry Clay. Polk won Indiana by a narrow margin of 1.65%.

Results

See also
 United States presidential elections in Indiana

References

Indiana
1844
1844 Indiana elections